Malcolm Lewis (born October 27, 1993) is an American football wide receiver for the Winnipeg Blue Bombers of the Canadian Football League (CFL). He played college football at the University of Miami.

High school career
Four-star recruit according to Rivals.com and ESPN, No.18 wide receiver prospect and No. 29 overall recruit in Florida according to ESPN. Choose Miami over Florida State.

College career
Lewis was a reserve wide receiver during his time at Miami. At Miami's Pro Day Lewis ran a 4.44s 40-yard dash.

Professional career

Miami Dolphins
Lewis signed with the Miami Dolphins as an undrafted free agent on May 5, 2017. He was waived on September 2, 2017 and was signed to the practice squad the next day. He signed a reserve/future contract with the Dolphins on January 1, 2018.

On September 1, 2018, Lewis was waived by the Dolphins. On October 11, Lewis was signed by the Dolphins to their practice squad.

Winnipeg Blue Bombers
Lewis signed a futures contract with the Winnipeg Blue Bombers of the Canadian Football League (CFL) on November 1, 2019. After the CFL canceled the 2020 season due to the COVID-19 pandemic, Lewis chose to opt-out of his contract with the Blue Bombers on August 26, 2020. He opted back in to his contract on January 15, 2021. He was placed on the suspended list on July 9, 2021.

References

1993 births
Living people
American football wide receivers
Players of American football from Florida
Miami Dolphins players
Miami Hurricanes football players
People from Miramar, Florida
Winnipeg Blue Bombers players
Sportspeople from Broward County, Florida
Players of Canadian football from Florida
Miramar High School alumni